The Challenge Monégasque football cup is a football tournament for amateur football teams from Monaco, beginning in 1991.

In recent years, the tournament has been seen as a third level competition in the country, below the Challenge Prince Rainier III and the Trophée Ville de Monaco.

Records

A list of clubs that have made it to at least 1 Challenge Monégasque final, reflecting their success in  finals. (Up to and including the 2006 season).

List of Winners

Scores in brackets are penalty shoot-out results.

See also
Challenge Prince Rainier III
Trophée Ville de Monaco
Football in Monaco
List of football clubs in Monaco

References

Football competitions in Monaco